Triathlon at the 2015 Pacific Games in Port Moresby, Papua New Guinea was held on July 5, 2015.

Medal summary

Medal table

Results

See also
 Triathlon at the Pacific Games

References

2015 Pacific Games
Pacific Games
2015